CCDC may stand for:
The Cairo Contemporary Dance Center
The Cambridge Crystallographic Data Centre
Catoctin Creek Distilling Company, a distillery based Virginia, United States
Chinatown Community Development Center in San Francisco, which also created the Adopt-An-Alleyway Youth Empowerment Project
China Central Depository & Clearing Co., Ltd., based in Beijing, China
Chinese Center for Disease Control and Prevention, based in Beijing, China
City Contemporary Dance Company, a leading modern dance company in Hong Kong
Collegiate Cyber Defense Competition, a series of defensive computer security contests in the United States
Columbus County Detention Center, a Correctional Institution in North Carolina, also called Columbus Correctional Institution
United States Army Combat Capabilities Development Command, headquartered at Aberdeen Proving Ground, Maryland
Community College of the District of Columbia, located in Washington, D.C., United States
United States Circuit Court of the District of Columbia, abbreviated C.C.D.C. in case citations